Jeremiah Nelson (September 14, 1769October 2, 1838) was a Representative from Massachusetts.

Nelson was born in Rowley in the Province of Massachusetts Bay on September 14, 1769 to Solomon and Elizabeth (Mighill) Nelson. He graduated from Dartmouth College, Hanover, New Hampshire, in 1790. He engaged in the mercantile business in Newburyport, Massachusetts.

He was a member of the general court of Massachusetts in 1803 and 1804, was elected as a Federalist to the Ninth Congress (March 4, 1805 – March 3, 1807); he was not a candidate for renomination in 1806 to the Tenth Congress. In 1811, he served as chairman of the board of selectmen of Newburyport. He was again elected to the Congress and to the four succeeding Congresses, serving from (March 4, 1815 – March 3, 1825). During the (Seventeenth and Eighteenth Congresses) he was chairman of the Committee on Expenditures on Public Buildings. He was not a candidate for renomination in 1824 to the Nineteenth Congress.

He served as president of the Newburyport Mutual Fire Co. in 1829. He returned to Congress as an Anti-Jacksonian for the Twenty-second Congress (March 4, 1831 – March 3, 1833). He declined to be a candidate for renomination in 1832. After leaving politics, he engaged in the shipping business. Nelson died in Newburyport, Massachusetts, October 2, 1838, and was interred in Oak Hill Cemetery.

References

 

1769 births
1838 deaths
Politicians from Newburyport, Massachusetts
Dartmouth College alumni
Massachusetts National Republicans
19th-century American politicians
Members of the Massachusetts House of Representatives
Federalist Party members of the United States House of Representatives from Massachusetts
National Republican Party members of the United States House of Representatives